{{automatic taxobox
|image=Selenophorus.parumpunctatus.-.calwer.06.01.jpg
|image_caption= Selenophorus parumpunctatus'
| taxon = Selenophorus
| authority = Dejean, 1831
}}Selenophorus is a genus of beetles in the family Carabidae, first described by Pierre François Marie Auguste Dejean in 1831.

 Species Selenophorus contains the following 171 species:

 Selenophorus abaxoides Reiche, 1843
 Selenophorus acutangulus (Putzeys, 1878)
 Selenophorus aeneopiceus Casey, 1884
 Selenophorus aequinoctialis Dejean, 1829
 Selenophorus affinis Dejean, 1831
 Selenophorus agilis Putzeys, 1878
 Selenophorus agonoides (Putzeys, 1878)
 Selenophorus alternans Dejean, 1829
 Selenophorus amaroides Dejean, 1829
 Selenophorus anceps Dejean, 1831
 Selenophorus angulatus Chaudoir, 1843
 Selenophorus antarcticus Steinheil, 1869
 Selenophorus apicalis Putzeys, 1878
 Selenophorus assimilis Putzeys, 1878
 Selenophorus aureocupreus Bates, 1891
 Selenophorus aurichalceus Dejean, 1831
 Selenophorus balli Messer & Raber, 2021
 Selenophorus barbadensis Ball & Shpeley, 1992
 Selenophorus barysomoides Putzeys, 1878
 Selenophorus batesi Putzeys, 1878
 Selenophorus blanchardi Manee, 1915
 Selenophorus blandus Dejean, 1829
 Selenophorus bradycelloides Bates, 1891
 Selenophorus brasiliensis (Chaudoir, 1837)
 Selenophorus brevis (Putzeys, 1878)
 Selenophorus breviusculus G.Horn, 1880
 Selenophorus callistichus Bates, 1878
 Selenophorus cardionotus Putzeys, 1878
 Selenophorus cayennensis Fauvel, 1861
 Selenophorus chalceus Putzeys, 1878
 Selenophorus chalcosomus Reiche, 1843
 Selenophorus chaparralus Purrington, 2000
 Selenophorus chiriquinus Bates, 1882
 Selenophorus chryses Bates, 1884
 Selenophorus clypealis Ball & Shpeley, 1992
 Selenophorus concinnus Schaeffer, 1910
 Selenophorus confinis R.Sahlberg, 1844
 Selenophorus contractus (Casey, 1914)
 Selenophorus coracinus Dejean, 1829
 Selenophorus cordatus Putzeys, 1878
 Selenophorus curvipes Putzeys, 1878
 Selenophorus cyaneus Putzeys, 1878
 Selenophorus cyclogonus (Putzeys, 1878)
 Selenophorus dessalinesi Ball & Shpeley, 1992
 Selenophorus dichromatus Casey, 1914
 Selenophorus dilutipes Putzeys, 1878
 Selenophorus dimidiatulus Emden, 1958
 Selenophorus discopunctatus Dejean, 1829
 Selenophorus dispar Bates, 1891
 Selenophorus distinctus Putzeys, 1878
 Selenophorus dives Bates, 1884
 Selenophorus dubius Putzeys, 1878
 Selenophorus ellipticus Dejean, 1829
 Selenophorus elytrostictus Messer & Raber, 2021
 Selenophorus emarginatus Putzeys, 1878
 Selenophorus emendi Reichardt, 1976
 Selenophorus exilis Dejean, 1831
 Selenophorus fabricii Shpeley, Hunting & Ball, 2017
 Selenophorus faldermanni Putzeys, 1878
 Selenophorus fatuus (Leconte, 1863)
 Selenophorus flavilabris Dejean, 1829
 Selenophorus flavipes Putzeys, 1878
 Selenophorus fossulatus Dejean, 1829
 Selenophorus foveatus Putzeys, 1878
 Selenophorus foveolatus Chaudoir, 1843
 Selenophorus fulvicornis Putzeys, 1878
 Selenophorus gagatinus Dejean, 1829
 Selenophorus galapagoensis G.R.Waterhouse, 1845
 Selenophorus genuinus Putzeys, 1878
 Selenophorus glabripennis Putzeys, 1878
 Selenophorus granarius Dejean, 1829
 Selenophorus hepburni Bates, 1884
 Selenophorus hylacis (Say, 1823)
 Selenophorus illustris Putzeys, 1878
 Selenophorus insularis Boheman, 1858
 Selenophorus integer (Fabricius, 1801)
 Selenophorus intermedius (Putzeys, 1878)
 Selenophorus irec Shpeley, Hunting & Ball, 2017
 Selenophorus irideus Reiche, 1843
 Selenophorus irinus (Reiche, 1843)
 Selenophorus iviei Shpeley, Hunting & Ball, 2017
 Selenophorus lacordairei Dejean, 1831
 Selenophorus laevicollis (Bates, 1884)
 Selenophorus latior Darlington, 1934
 Selenophorus limbolaris Perty, 1830
 Selenophorus liodiscus Putzeys, 1878
 Selenophorus lubricipes Dejean, 1831
 Selenophorus macleayi (Kirby, 1837)
 Selenophorus marginepilosus Steinheil, 1869
 Selenophorus marginepunctatus (Dejean, 1829)
 Selenophorus maritimus Casey, 1914
 Selenophorus mendicus Putzeys, 1878
 Selenophorus mexicanus (Putzeys, 1878)
 Selenophorus misellus Putzeys, 1878
 Selenophorus modestus Putzeys, 1878
 Selenophorus multiporus Bates, 1884
 Selenophorus multipunctatus Dejean, 1829
 Selenophorus mundus Putzeys, 1878
 Selenophorus myrmidon Dejean, 1831
 Selenophorus neoruficollis Messer & Raber, 2021
 Selenophorus nonellipticus Messer & Raber, 2021
 Selenophorus nonseriatus Darlington, 1934
 Selenophorus obscuricornis (G.R.Waterhouse, 1845)
 Selenophorus obscurus Putzeys, 1878
 Selenophorus obtusoides Shpeley, Hunting & Ball, 2017
 Selenophorus obtusus Dejean, 1829
 Selenophorus opacus Putzeys, 1878
 Selenophorus opalinus (Leconte, 1863)
 Selenophorus palliatus (Fabricius, 1798)
 Selenophorus pampicola Steinheil, 1869
 Selenophorus paramundus Ball & Shpeley, 1992
 Selenophorus pararuficollis Messer & Raber, 2021
 Selenophorus parumpunctatus Dejean, 1829
 Selenophorus parvus Darlington, 1934
 Selenophorus pedicularius Dejean, 1829
 Selenophorus placidus (Putzeys, 1878)
 Selenophorus planipennis Leconte, 1848
 Selenophorus pleuriticus Putzeys, 1878
 Selenophorus poeciloides Putzeys, 1878
 Selenophorus promptus Dejean, 1829
 Selenophorus propinquus Putzeys, 1874
 Selenophorus pseudomundus Ball & Shpeley, 1992
 Selenophorus pulcherrimus Emden, 1949
 Selenophorus pullus Dejean, 1829
 Selenophorus pumilus Messer & Raber, 2021
 Selenophorus punctiger Kirsch, 1873
 Selenophorus punctipennis Putzeys, 1878
 Selenophorus punctulatus Dejean, 1829
 Selenophorus pusillus Putzeys, 1878
 Selenophorus pusio Putzeys, 1878
 Selenophorus putzeysi Csiki, 1932
 Selenophorus pyritosus Dejean, 1829
 Selenophorus rileyi Messer & Raber, 2021
 Selenophorus rodriguezi Putzeys, 1878
 Selenophorus rufescens Putzeys, 1878
 Selenophorus ruficollis (Putzeys, 1878)
 Selenophorus rufulus Putzeys, 1878
 Selenophorus rugipennis Putzeys, 1878
 Selenophorus rugulosus Putzeys, 1878
 Selenophorus sallei Putzeys, 1878
 Selenophorus satyrus Putzeys, 1878
 Selenophorus schaefferi Csiki, 1932
 Selenophorus scitulus Dejean, 1829
 Selenophorus seriatoporus Putzeys, 1878
 Selenophorus sinuaticollis Notman, 1922
 Selenophorus solitarius Darlington, 1934
 Selenophorus spinosus Shpeley, Hunting & Ball, 2017
 Selenophorus splendidus Putzeys, 1878
 Selenophorus steinheili Blackwelder, 1944
 Selenophorus striatopunctatus Putzeys, 1878
 Selenophorus suavis Bates, 1884
 Selenophorus subaeneus Reiche, 1843
 Selenophorus subcordatus Putzeys, 1878
 Selenophorus subpunctatus Reiche, 1843
 Selenophorus subquadratus (Putzeys, 1878)
 Selenophorus subsinuatus Putzeys, 1878
 Selenophorus tarsalis Putzeys, 1878
 Selenophorus tesselatus Putzeys, 1878
 Selenophorus tibialis Putzeys, 1878
 Selenophorus trepidus (Casey, 1924)
 Selenophorus tubericauda Bates, 1884
 Selenophorus undatus Messer & Raber, 2021
 Selenophorus valgus Bates, 1884
 Selenophorus variabilis Curtis, 1839
 Selenophorus variegatus Dejean, 1831
 Selenophorus ventralis Putzeys, 1878
 Selenophorus vicinus Dejean, 1829
 Selenophorus vilis Putzeys, 1878
 Selenophorus woodruffi Ball & Shpeley, 1992
 Selenophorus xantholomus Putzeys, 1878
 Selenophorus yucatanus'' Putzeys, 1878

References

Harpalinae
Carabidae genera
Taxa named by Pierre François Marie Auguste Dejean